The Campeonato Uruguayo Federal de Básquetbol (CFB) (English: Uruguayan Federal Basketball Championship) was the top-tier level men's basketball national club competition in Uruguay. It was organized by the Uruguayan Basketball Federation (FUBB). It existed from 1915 to 2003, when it was replaced by the newly formed Liga Uruguaya de Básquetbol (LUB) (Uruguayan Basketball League). The worst performing teams of each season of the competition were relegated down to the second-tier level Segunda de Ascenso (Second of Ascent), which itself was replaced by the Torneo Metropolitano (Metropolitan Tournament), in 2004.

History
The Campeonato Uruguayo Federal de Básquetbol (Uruguayan Federal Basketball Championship) was founded in 1915, making it among the oldest basketball competitions on the South American continent. Until the Uruguayan Basketball League was created in 2003, the Montevideo clubs were playing in the Uruguayan Federal Basketball Championship, while the rest of the country's clubs played in regional tournaments. The Uruguayan basketball championships were only local, and no competition brought all of the clubs in the country together.

Names of the competition
Campeonato Uruguayo de 1a. División de Básquetbol (Uruguayan Championship of 1a. Basketball Division): (1915–1918) 
Campeonato Uruguayo Nacional de Básquetbol (Uruguayan National Basketball Championship): (1918–1926)  
Campeonato Uruguayo Federal de Básquetbol (Uruguayan Federal Basketball Championship): (1927–2003)

Uruguayan Basketball League

The Liga Uruguaya de Básquetbol (LUB; Uruguayan Basketball League) competition replaced the Uruguayan Federal Basketball Championship, when it began in 2003.

Uruguayan Federal champions

 There were two tournaments held in 1918.

Titles by club

All-time leading scorers

See also
Uruguayan Basketball League (2003–present)
Uruguayan Basketball Champions
Uruguayan Basketball Federation (FUBB)

References

Sources
Greatest teams

External links
CAMPEONATOS DE PRIMERA DIVISION 
Uruguyan Basketball Federation FUBB official website 
Uruguayan Basketball League at Latinbasket.com 

1915 establishments in Uruguay
Basketball competitions in Uruguay
Uruguay
Basketball leagues in Uruguay
Defunct basketball leagues
Sports leagues established in 1915
Sports leagues in Uruguay